AFTA or Afta may refer to:
 Afta, a brand of aftershave by Mennen
 ASEAN Free Trade Area
 Galactan 5-O-arabinofuranosyltransferase, an enzyme
 American Family Therapy Academy, family therapy organisation founded in 1978 by Murray Bowen